Kerrytown is a small rural community in the Timaru District, Canterbury, New Zealand. It is located east of Pleasant Point and north-west of Timaru.

References

Timaru District
Populated places in Canterbury, New Zealand